Šarčević is a surname found in Serbia, Bosnia and Croatia. Notable people with the surname include:

Admir Šarčević (born 1967), Bosnian-Herzegovinian football player
Antoni Sarcevic (born 1992), English football player
Bojan Šarčević (born 1974), Bosnian-French visual artist
Igor Šarčević (born 1984), Serbian decathlete and bobsledder
Ina Šarčević (born 1959), Yugoslav-American astrophysicist
Jovan Šarčević (1966–2015), Serbian football player
Miloje Šarčević (born 1993), Serbian football midfielder 
Mladen Šarčević (born 1957), Serbian politician
Nemanja Šarčević (born 1984), Serbian politician
Nikola Šarčević (born 1974), Swedish punk rock musician
Petar A. Šarčević, Croatian diplomat
Ray Sarcevic (born 1964), Australian rules footballer

Serbian surnames
Bosnian surnames
Croatian surnames